The Roman Catholic Diocese of San Jose de Antique (Lat: Dioecesis Sancti Iosephi de Antiquonia) is a diocese of the Roman Rite of the Latin Church of the Catholic Church whose cathedral is in the city of San Jose de Buenavista, Antique in the Philippines.

History of the Diocese
On 18 June 1962, Pope John XXIII erected the Territorial Prelature of San Jose de Antique with the Apostolic Constitution "Novae cuiusque Ecclesiae constitutio". The new territorial prelature was separated from the Archdiocese of Jaro comprising the whole province of Antique and became a suffragan to the Archdiocese of Jaro.

On 15 November 1982, Pope John Paul II elevated San Jose de Antique and other territorial prelatures to the rank of diocese while remaining a suffragan to Jaro.

On 7 January 2019, after a year Pope Francis appointed Msgr. Marvyn Maceda, Vicar General of the Roman Catholic Diocese of Naval in Biliran, as the 5th Bishop of San Jose de Antique

Ordinaries

References

San Jose de Antique
San Jose de Antique
Christian organizations established in 1962
Roman Catholic dioceses and prelatures established in the 20th century
Religion in Antique (province)